The Pakistan national rugby union team represents Pakistan in international rugby union. Pakistan is a member of the International Rugby Board (IRB), and have yet to play in a Rugby World Cup tournament. As of 2021, they will play in Division II of the Asian championships, having been promoted from Division III in 2019.

In the 19 March 2012 IRB World Rankings, Pakistan, along with Mexico and Philippines, were listed for the first time, entering with the base rating of 40 points (which positioned the three national teams in 71st place).

The national side is ranked 92nd in the world, as of 16 January 2023.

History
The Pakistan national team made their international debut in a match against Sri Lanka in 2003, losing 75-3. They won their first match in 2006 against Guam by 27-22.
Recently Pakistan Under-19 Rugby Team participates in South Asian A5N Rugby 7s Championship 2013 and won Gold. They played against Afghanistan and final against India. Daud Gill, Ali Shahid, Ahmad Wasim Akram, Mohammad Owais Akram, Hassan Shah, Danish Aleem, Ayub were some senior Players of the team.

Since their first match, Pakistan have played a total of 20 matches, with only 4 wins and 16 losses.

Pakistan rugby sevens made its international debut at the 2014 Asian Games in Incheon, South Korea, in the highly competitive Pool B with matches against China, Hong Kong, and the Philippines.

Strip
Pakistan play in green jerseys with gold and white trim, manufactured by Teejac Sports.

Record

World Cup
1987 - No qualifying tournament held
1991-1999 - Not into existence
2003-2007 - Did not enter
2011-2019 - Did not qualify

Overall

Current squad
Squad for the 2022 Asia Rugby Championship.

See also
Rugby union in Pakistan
2011 Rugby World Cup – Asia qualification

References

External links
 Pakistan on IRB.com
 Pakistan on rugbydata.com
 Pakistan Rugby
 
 Pakistan Official Games

R
Rugby
Rugby union in Pakistan